In baseball statistics, a double play (denoted as DP) is the act of making two outs during the same continuous play. One double play is recorded for every defensive player who participates in the play, regardless of how many of the outs in which they were directly involved, and is counted in addition to whatever putouts and assists might also apply. Double plays can occur any time there is at least one baserunner and fewer than two outs. In baseball and softball, the second baseman is a fielding position in the infield, commonly stationed between second and first base. The second baseman often possesses quick hands and feet, needs the ability to get rid of the ball quickly, and must be able to make the pivot on a double play. In addition, second basemen are almost always right-handed. Only four left-handed throwing players have appeared as second basemen in the major leagues since 1950; one of the four, Gonzalo Márquez, was listed as the second baseman in the starting lineup for two games in 1973, batting in the first inning, but was replaced before his team took the field on defense, and none of the other three players lasted even a complete inning at the position. In the numbering system used to record defensive plays, the second baseman is assigned the number 4.

Second basemen typically record a double play by receiving a throw from another player to force out the runner advancing to second base, then throwing to first base to retire the batter/runner, or by fielding a ground ball and then either throwing to the shortstop covering second base or stepping on the base themselves before the throw to first base is made. Second basemen generally benefit in this respect from playing alongside an excellent shortstop with great range and quickness; strong middle infields are regarded as crucial to a team's defensive play, and double play totals are regarded as a strong indicator of their defensive skill. Double plays are also recorded when the second baseman catches a line drive, then throws to a base before the runner can tag up, or another infielder or the pitcher catches the line drive and then throws to the second baseman in the same situation; on occasion, the throw might come from an outfielder after an unexpected catch of a fly ball. Other double plays occur when the second baseman records an out at second base, then throws out a runner attempting to advance on the basepaths, or on a double steal attempt in which the catcher throws out a runner attempting to steal second base, and the second baseman throws back to the catcher to retire a runner trying to steal home. Double plays are also occasionally recorded when a rundown play is involved, almost always as the second out. Because of the high number of ground outs, second basemen and shortstops typically record far more double plays than players at any other position except first base.

Most of the career leaders are relatively recent players who have benefitted from improved infield defense, with equipment of better quality; 9 of the top 14 players made their major league debut after 1962, and only two were active before 1945. Longer careers have compensated for the fact that as strikeout totals have risen in baseball, the frequency of other defensive outs including ground outs has declined, with double play totals for second basemen likewise declining; 23 of the top 29 single-season totals were recorded between 1935 and 1974, and none of the top 362 were recorded before 1921. Bill Mazeroski holds the record for the most career double plays by a second baseman with 1,706. Nellie Fox is second with 1,619; only four other second basemen have recorded 1,500 career double plays.

Key

List

Stats updated through the 2022 season

Other Hall of Famers

Notes

References

External links

Major League Baseball statistics
Double plays as a second baseman